A micro-series (also microseries) is an extremely short episodic television programming 
narrative sponsored by an advertiser. This is a non-traditional way of reaching primary markets. A micro-series is intended to promote a product while engaging viewers with entertaining content. A micro-series is often only a season in length, and episodes are generally two to three minutes long, often playing during commercial breaks of popular television programs. After each air date, they are also available online and on mobile devices.

Popular micro-series 
Even if it doesn't have a wide audience, a micro-series creates buzz, especially if it is interactive, as in the case of CBS's 2006 micro-series, The Courier.
Sometimes a spin-off micro-series is created from a popular TV show, for example, NBC's prime-time hit, Heroes. In November 2008, Sprint Nextel sponsored a four-episode micro-series called Heroes: Destiny on mobile, online and television. Each five-to-seven minutes episode debuted on Monday nights. The micro-series featured Sprint's  phone in some scenes in what David Lang, head of MindShare Entertainment, calls "subtle integration." Sprint ads also aired adjacent to the on-air promos.

It is important that the micro-series content fits the environment or theme of the program in which it airs. A good example of this is TBS's micro-series Commuter Confidential. In 2008, TBS debuted a two-minute episode of Commuter Confidential featuring Revlon products and Match.com, during Sex and the City. The micro-series plot line mirrors the comedy of the HBO produced Sex and the City. Confidential features four female characters and their diverse ways of dealing with the world around them.

With the advent of the digital video recording (DVR), advertisers are trying to create brand messages that defeat the fast-forward button.  General Motors is sponsoring a five-part micro-series, My Manny on Turner Broadcasting's TBS, to highlight the features on its new Traverse Crossover vehicle. It airs during the original series Tyler Perry's House of Payne.

With the success of the My Manny series – now in its third season – General Motors sponsored a new series, Gillian in Georgia, which aired on TBS in the spring of 2010. The show stars Jill Marie Jones of Girlfriends fame and centers around a hip New Yorker who comes to the South to live with her sister's family. The show airs during TBS’ popular sitcom Meet the Browns.

Unilever, too has gotten into the micro-series action. Singer Alicia Keys was selected by Dove and MTV to star in their "real beauty" micro-series called Fresh Takes. The series revolves around a group of twenty-something females and the pressures they must overcome in order to pursue their dreams. Each miniseries aired as a commercial interstitial during the March 24, 2008 premiere of The Hills. The micro-series is intended to promote the new Dove products while confronting the issues of self-esteem.

Sometimes a micro-series may turn into a half-hour television sitcom, as in the case of In the Motherhood, a series of online shorts about moms coping with their chaotic lives – with help from Spring Nextel services and Suave hair care products. This micro-series just got picked up for the midseason lineup on ABC. It will anchor a new comedy block on Thursdays, one of the most competitive nights of TV.

References

Television genres
Advertising techniques